Alison Krauss is an American bluegrass-country singer and fiddler. She has released 16 studio albums—seven with the band Union Station and nine without them: Different Strokes (1985), Too Late to Cry (1987), Two Highways (1989), I've Got That Old Feeling (1991), Every Time You Say Goodbye (1992), I Know Who Holds Tomorrow (1994), So Long So Wrong (1997), Forget About It (1999), New Favorite (2001), Lonely Runs Both Ways (2004), and Raising Sand (2007). Krauss has released five compilation albums—Now That I've Found You: A Collection (1995), Live (2002), Home on the Highways: Band Picked Favorites (2005), A Hundred Miles or More: A Collection (2007), and Essential Alison Krauss (2009)—and made other notable recordings such as the single "Whiskey Lullaby" with Brad Paisley and her several songs on the O Brother, Where Art Thou? soundtrack.

The albums Now That I've Found You and Live were certified double platinum by the Recording Industry Association of America; Forget About It and Raising Sand were certified platinum; and So Long So Wrong, New Favorite, Lonely Runs Both Ways, and the single Whiskey Lullaby were certified gold. Krauss has won 27 Grammy Awards. She has also won 14 International Bluegrass Music Association Awards, nine Country Music Association Awards, two Gospel Music Association Awards, two CMT Music Awards, two Academy of Country Music Awards, and one Canadian Country Music Award. Country Music Television ranked Krauss 12th on their "40 Greatest Women of Country Music" list in 2002. The National Academy of Recording Arts and Sciences presented her with a special musical achievement honor in 2005. Overall, Krauss has received 59 awards from 105 nominations.

Awards and nominations

Academy of Country Music Awards
The Academy of Country Music Awards have been presented annually by the Academy of Country Music since 1965. Krauss has received two awards from nine nominations.

|-
| 1995 || Alison Krauss || Top New Female Vocalist || 
|-
| 1998 || "Same Old Train" || Vocal Event of the Year || 
|-
| 2000 || "Buy Me a Rose" (with Kenny Rogers) || Vocal Event of the Year || 
|-
| 2003 || "How's the World Treating You" (with James Taylor) || Vocal Event of the Year || 
|-
|rowspan="5"| 2004 ||rowspan="4"| "Whiskey Lullaby" (with Brad Paisley) || Vocal Event of the Year || 
|-
| Video of the Year || 
|-
| Single Record of the Year || 
|-
| Song of the Year || 
|-
| Alison Krauss & Union Station || Top Vocal Group || 
|-

Americana Music Honors and Awards
The Americana Music Honors & Awards have been presented annually by the Americana Music Association since 2002. Krauss has received two awards from three nominations.

|-
|rowspan="3"| 2008 || Alison Krauss & Robert Plant || Duo/Group of the Year || 
|-
 || Raising Sand (with Robert Plant) || Album of the Year || 
|-
 || Gone Gone Gone (Done Moved On) || Song of the Year ||

Canadian Country Music Awards
The Canadian Country Music Awards have been presented annually by the Canadian Country Music Association since 1982. Krauss has received one award.

|-
| 2001 || "Get Me Through December" (with Natalie MacMaster) || Vocal/Instrumental Collaboration of the Year || 
|-

Country Music Association Awards
The Country Music Association Awards have been presented annually by the Country Music Association since 1967, and are usually presented at the Grand Ole Opry. Krauss has received 8 awards from 26 nominations.

|-
|rowspan="4"| 1995 ||rowspan="2"| Alison Krauss || Female Vocalist of the Year || 
|-
| Horizon Award || 
|-
| "Somewhere in the Vicinity of the Heart" (with Shenandoah) || Vocal Event of the Year || 
|-
| "When You Say Nothing At All" || Single of the Year || 
|-
| 1999 || "Same Old Train" || Vocal Event of the Year || 
|-
|rowspan="3"| 2001 || O Brother, Where Art Thou? || Album of the Year || 
|-
| "I'll Fly Away" (with Gillian Welch) || Vocal Event of the Year || 
|-
| "Didn't Leave Nobody But the Baby" || Vocal Event of the Year || 
|-
|rowspan="3"| 2002 || New Favorite || Album of the Year || 
|-
| Alison Krauss || Female Vocalist of the Year || 
|-
| "I'll Fly Away" (with Gillian Welch) || Vocal Event of the Year || 
|-
| 2003 || Alison Krauss || Female Vocalist of the Year || 
|-
|rowspan="5"| 2004 ||rowspan="3"| "Whiskey Lullaby" (with Brad Paisley) || Musical Event of the Year || 
|-
| Music Video of the Year || 
|-
| Single of the Year || 
|-
| "How's The World Treating You" (with James Taylor) || Musical Event of the Year || 
|-
| Alison Krauss || Female Vocalist of the Year || 
|-
|rowspan="2"| 2005 || Alison Krauss || Female Vocalist of the Year || 
|-
| Alison Krauss & Union Station || Vocal Group of the Year || 
|-
| 2006 || Alison Krauss & Union Station || Vocal Group of the Year || 
|-
|rowspan="4"| 2007 || Alison Krauss || Female Vocalist of the Year || 
|-
| "Missing You" || Musical Event of the Year || 
|-
| "The Reason Why" || Musical Event of the Year || 
|-
| Alison Krauss & Union Station || Vocal Group of the Year || 
|-
|rowspan="2"| 2008 || "Gone, Gone, Gone (Done Moved On)" (with Robert Plant) || Musical Event of the Year || 
|-
| Alison Krauss || Female Vocalist of the Year || 
|-

CMT Music Awards
The CMT Music Awards are a fan-voted awards show for country music videos and television performances broadcast on and awarded by Country Music Television since 2002. Krauss has received two awards from four nominations.

|-
|rowspan="2"| 2005 ||rowspan="2"| "Whiskey Lullaby" || Collaborative Video of the Year || 
|-
| Video of the Year || 
|-
| 2008 || "Gone Gone Gone (Done Moved On)" (with Robert Plant) || Wide Open County Video of the Year || 
|-
|rowspan="2"| 2009 || "Please Read the Letter" (with Robert Plant) || Wide Open County Video of the Year || 
|-
| "Gone Gone Gone (Done Moved On)" || CMT Performance of the Year || 
|-

Gospel Music Association Dove Awards
The Gospel Music Association Dove Awards were created in 1969 by the Gospel Music Association to honor the outstanding achievements in Christian music. Krauss has received two awards.

|-
| 1998 || "Living Prayer" || Bluegrass Recorded Song of the Year || 
|-
| 2006 || "Children of the Living God" || Bluegrass Recorded Song of the Year || 
|-

Grammy Awards
The Grammy Awards are awarded annually by the National Academy of Recording Arts and Sciences of the United States. As of the 2015 Grammy Awards, Krauss has received 27 awards from 44 nominations. Those 27 wins make her the most awarded singer until Beyonce surpassed the record in 2021, the second most awarded female artist, and tied for the fourth most awarded artist overall in Grammy history. At the time of her first award, at the 1991 Grammy Awards, she was the second youngest winner ever (currently tied as ninth youngest).

|-
|  || Two Highways || Best Bluegrass Recording || 
|-
|  || I've Got That Old Feeling || Best Bluegrass Recording || 
|-
|  || Every Time You Say Goodbye || Best Bluegrass Album || 
|-
|rowspan="3"|  || "When You Say Nothing At All" || Best Country Performance by a Duo or Group with Vocal || 
|-
| "Teach Your Children" || Best Country Vocal Collaboration || 
|-
| I Know Who Holds Tomorrow || Best Southern Gospel, Country Gospel or Bluegrass Gospel Album || 
|-
|rowspan="2"|  || "Baby, Now That I've Found You" || Best Female Country Vocal Performance || 
|-
| "Somewhere in the Vicinity of the Heart" || Best Country Collaboration with Vocals || 
|-
|rowspan="2"|  || "Baby Mine" || Best Female Country Vocal Performance || 
|-
| "High Lonesome Sound" || Best Country Collaboration with Vocals || 
|-
|rowspan="3"|  || "Looking in the Eyes of Love" || Best Country Performance by a Duo or Group with Vocal || 
|-
| "Little Liza Jane" || Best Country Instrumental Performance || 
|-
| So Long So Wrong || Best Bluegrass Album || 
|-
|  || "Same Old Train" || Best Country Collaboration with Vocals || 
|-
|rowspan="2"|  || "Forget About It" || Best Female Country Vocal Performance || 
|-
| Forget About It || Best Country Album || 
|-
|rowspan="5"|  || O Brother, Where Art Thou? || Album of the Year ||
|-
| New Favorite || Best Bluegrass Album || 
|-
| "The Lucky One" || Best Country Performance by a Duo or Group with Vocal || 
|-
| "Choctaw Hayride" || Best Country Instrumental Performance || 
|-
| "Didn't Leave Nobody But The Baby" || Best Country Collaboration with Vocals || 
|-
|rowspan="2"|  || "Can the Circle Be Unbroken (By and By)" || Best Country Collaboration with Vocals || 
|-
| This Side || Best Contemporary Folk Album || 
|-
|rowspan="3"|  || "How's The World Treating You" (with James Taylor) || Best Country Collaboration with Vocals || 
|-
| "Cluck Old Hen" || Best Country Instrumental Performance || 
|-
| Live || Best Bluegrass Album || 
|-
|rowspan="2"|  || "You Will Be My Ain True Love" || Best Female Country Vocal Performance || 
|-
| "Coat of Many Colors" (with Shania Twain) || Best Country Collaboration with Vocals || 
|-
|rowspan="3"|  || "Restless" || Best Country Performance by a Duo or Group with Vocal || 
|-
| "Unionhouse Branch" || Best Country Instrumental Performance || 
|-
| Lonely Runs Both Ways || Best Country Album || 
|-
|rowspan="3"|  || "Gone Gone Gone (Done Moved On)" (with Robert Plant) || Best Pop Collaboration with Vocals || 
|-
| "Simple Love" || Best Female Country Vocal Performance || 
|-
| These Days (as featured artist) || Album Of The Year || 
|-
|rowspan="5"|  ||rowspan="2"| Raising Sand (with Robert Plant and T-Bone Burnett) || Album of the Year || 
|-
| Best Contemporary Folk/Americana Album || 
|-
| "Please Read the Letter" (with Robert Plant) || Record of the Year || 
|-
| "Rich Woman" (with Robert Plant) || Best Pop Collaboration with Vocals || 
|-
| "Killing the Blues" (with Robert Plant) || Best Country Collaboration with Vocals || 
|-
| || Paper Airplane|| Best Bluegrass Album || 
|-
| || "I Just Come Here For The Music" (with Don Williams)|| Best Country Duo/Group Performance || 
|-
| || "And When I Die" (with Billy Childs & Jerry Douglas)|| Best American Roots Performance || 
|-
|rowspan="2"|2018 || "Losing You" || Best Country Solo Performance || 
|-
| "I Never Cared For You" || Best American Roots Performance || 
|-
|rowspan="2"|2023 || "Going Where the Lonely Go" (with Robert Plant) || Best Country Duo/Group Performance || 
|-
| Raise the Roof (with Robert Plant) || Best Americana Album ||

International Bluegrass Music Association Awards
Founded in 1985, the International Bluegrass Music Association Awards are awarded annually by the International Bluegrass Music Association. Krauss has received 14 awards, including two wins of the top honor: Entertainer of the Year.

In 2021, she was inducted into the association's International Bluegrass Music Hall of Fame.

|-
| 1990 || Alison Krauss || Female Vocalist of the Year || 
|-
|rowspan="3"| 1991 || Alison Krauss || Female Vocalist of the Year || 
|-
| Alison Krauss & Union Station || Entertainer of the Year || 
|-
| I've Got That Old Feeling || Album of the Year || 
|-
|rowspan="2"| 1993 || Alison Krauss || Female Vocalist of the Year || 
|-
| Everytime You Say Goodbye || Album of the Year || 
|-
|rowspan="2"| 1995 || Alison Krauss || Female Vocalist of the Year || 
|-
| Alison Krauss & Union Station || Entertainer of the Year || 
|-
| 1997 || "High Lonesome Sound" || Song of the Year || 
|-
|rowspan="2"| 2001 || O Brother, Where Art Thou? || Album of the Year || 
|-
| "I'll Fly Away" || Gospel Recorded Performance of the Year || 
|-
| 2002 || Down from the Mountain || Album of the Year || 
|-
| 2003 || Live || Album of the Year || 
|-
| 2004 || Livin', Lovin', Losin': Songs of the Louvin Brothers'' || Recorded Event of the Year || 
|-

References

Krauss, Alison